Gregory "Greg" R. Page (born 1952) is an American businessman. He served as executive chairman of Cargill, Inc. of Minnetonka, Minnesota.

Early life
Gregory R. Page was born in 1952 in Bottineau, North Dakota. He graduated with a bachelor's degree in economics from the University of North Dakota, where he was a member of the Alpha Tau Omega fraternity.

Cargill Inc
He joined Cargill in 1974, and began his career as a trainee assigned to the Feed Division. From 1995 to 1998, Page was the president of the Red Meat Group. In 1998 to 2000, Page served as the corporate vice president and sector president of financial markets and Red Meat Group.  Since 2000, Page has served as the president and chief operating officer of Cargill Inc.

On June 1, 2007, Page was named chief executive officer of Cargill,  succeeding Warren Staley. Page served as executive chairman of the board of Cargill, Inc. from December 2013 to September 2015, when he announced his retirement.

Executive positions 
  President of the Northern Star Council of the Boy Scouts of America
 Chairman of Big Brothers-Big Sisters Of America and serves as its director
 Independent director of Eaton Corporation plc since April 23, 2003
 Director of Cargill Kft. since August 2000
 Independent director of Deere & Company since June 1, 2013 
 Director of Black River Asset Management LLC
 Director of Carlson Rezidor Hotel Group
 Director of Carlson Companies, Inc. since October 2010
 Member of Risky Business

Awards 
Page received Big Brothers Big Sisters of America's Charles G. Berwind LIfetime Achievement Award in 2011.

References

BEEF Chat: Cargill's Greg Page
Cargill, Incorporated Company Profile - Yahoo! Finance

1952 births
Living people
American chairpersons of corporations
Cargill people
People from Bottineau County, North Dakota
University of North Dakota alumni
20th-century American businesspeople